The Yishun Community Hospital (Abbreviation: YCH) is a 428-bed community hospital in Yishun, Singapore. It is part of an integrated healthcare development that includes the Khoo Teck Puat Hospital (abbreviated to KTPH).

References

External links 
 Yishun Community Hospital

Hospitals in Singapore
Yishun